Folkways can refer to:

Folkways or mores, in sociology, are norms for routine or casual interaction
Folkways Records, a record label founded by Moe Asch of the Smithsonian Institution in 1948 
Verve Folkways, an offshoot of Folkways Records formed in 1964
Smithsonian Folkways, the record label of the Smithsonian Institution, which incorporated Folkways Records in 1987
Folkways: The Original Vision, a 1989 album produced by Smithsonian Folkways documenting the origins of Folkways Records
 Folkways: The Original Vision (Woody and LeadBelly), a 2005 expanded version of the 1989 album
Folkways: a study of the sociological importance of usages, manners, customs, mores, and morals, a 1906 book by William Graham Sumner
Folkways: A Vision Shared, a 1988 album produced by CBS paying tribute to American musicians Woody Guthrie and Lead Belly